Minna Atherton (born 17 May 2000) is an Australian competitive swimmer who won the gold medals in the 100- and 200-metre backstroke events at the 2015 FINA World Junior Swimming Championships in Singapore. She tied the junior world record (held by American Claire Adams) in the 100-metre backstroke and broke the Championships record in the 200-metre backstroke.

In December 2015 at the Queensland State Swimming Championships in Brisbane, she broke the junior world record in the 100-metre backstroke with a time of 59.37. Two months later, in February 2016, she twice broke the junior world record in the 50-metre backstroke at the Brisbane Sprint Championships. In the heats she swam 27.73, followed by 27.49 in the final.

In April 2016, Atherton did not qualify for the 2016 Summer Olympics. Her best result at the Australian trials was a third-place finish in the 100-meter backstroke behind Emily Seebohm, who trains at the same club as Atherton, and Madison Wilson. Seebohm and Wilson were the gold and silver medalists in this event at the 2015 World Aquatics Championships.

In 2018 she was in the 2018 Gold Coast Commonwealth games which she didn't place in but made it into the backstroke finals.

International Swimming League 

Atherton is a member of the London Roar team, competing in the International Swimming League (ISL). The ISL is an annual professional swimming league featuring a team-based competition format with fast paced race sessions. 12 teams featuring the world’s best swimmers competed for the ISL title in 2021. During the 2019 International Swimming League season Atherton was the leading female backstroker in the league, winning ten of the twelve backstroke events she contested for the London Roar. Atherton was also the first person to break a world record while swimming an ISL race when she clocked 54.89 to win a 100 metre backstroke race at Budapest in October 2019.

World records

Short course metres

References

External links 
 
 
 
 
 

2000 births
Living people
Australian female backstroke swimmers
World Aquatics Championships medalists in swimming
World record holders in swimming
Commonwealth Games competitors for Australia
Swimmers at the 2018 Commonwealth Games
Swimmers at the 2022 Commonwealth Games
21st-century Australian women